Gordon Jones (born 6 March 1943) is an English former professional footballer who made 547 appearances in the Football League as a left-back for Middlesbrough and Darlington. Jones made more post-war appearances for Middlesbrough than any other player and second only to Tim Williamson in the club's long history. He went on to coach at non-league club Crook Town.

References

1943 births
Living people
People from Sedgefield
Footballers from County Durham
English footballers
England under-23 international footballers
Association football fullbacks
Middlesbrough F.C. players
Darlington F.C. players
English Football League players